Andy Cook may refer to:

Andy Cook (footballer, born 1969), English former professional footballer who played for Southampton, Exeter City, and Swansea City 
Andy Cook (footballer, born 1990), English professional footballer playing for Bradford City
Andy Cook (baseball) (born 1967), American former professional baseball pitcher

See also 
Andrew Cook (disambiguation)
Andy Cooke (born 1974), English professional footballer who plays for Market Drayton Town